Mechanical keyboards (or mechanical-switch keyboards) are computer keyboards which have an individual switch for each key.

The following table is a compilation list of mechanical keyboard models, brands, and series:

Mechanical keyboards

References 

Computer keyboards
Lists of computer hardware